Heliconius hecalesia, the five-spotted longwing, is a species of butterfly of the family Nymphalidae. It is found from Central America to Venezuela and Ecuador.

The wingspan is 50–61 mm. Adults feed on flower nectar.

The larvae feed on plants from the subgenera Tryphostemmatoides and Plectostemma, including Passiflora biflora and Passiflora lancearea. They are gregarious. Pupation takes place in a slate grey pupa with black markings.

Subspecies
H. h. hecalesia (Colombia)
H. h. formosus Bates, 1866 (Costa Rica, Panama, Nicaragua)
H. h. octavia Bates, 1866 (Guatemala)
H. h. gynaesia Hewitson, 1875
H. h. longarena Hewitson, 1875 (Colombia)
H. h. eximius Stichel, 1923 (Colombia)
H. h. romeroi Brown & Fernández, 1985 (Venezuela)

References

hecalesia
Nymphalidae of South America
Butterflies described in 1853